The Bold Italic is an online blog based in San Francisco. It was founded as an online magazine in 2009, as a collaboration between design firm IDEO and media company Gannett, who sold the magazine to local owners in 2015. In 2019 the magazine was acquired by Medium. In December 2022 Medium transferred ownership of the publication to the GrowSF political action committee for free.

The Bold Italic covers culture, events, local businesses and news in San Francisco, and is well known for series such as event-based bingo cards, Kid Food Reviews, and Made Up Charts. The style of reporting is often humorous and aimed at a young audience. The Bold Italic was a Webby honoree and an IDSA finalist, and was named best webzine by SF Weekly.

References

External links
 Official site

Lifestyle magazines published in the United States
Online magazines published in the United States
Local interest magazines published in the United States
Magazines published in San Francisco
Magazines established in 2009
2015 mergers and acquisitions